(also known as ) is a compilation album by Japanese duo Pink Lady. Released on December 1, 1993, the album includes two new songs: "2-nen me no Jinx" and "Pororoca".

Track listing 
 
 "S.O.S."
 
 
 
 "UFO"
 
 
 
 
 
 
 
 "Kiss in the Dark"
 
 
 
 
 
 "OH!"

References

External links

1993 greatest hits albums
Pink Lady (band) compilation albums
Victor Entertainment compilation albums